Air Force Base Overberg  is an airbase of the South African Air Force at Bredasdorp on the Overberg district of the Western Cape province and is the host of the 525 squadron and the Test Flight and Development Centre. It is placed under command of the Air Office in Pretoria, Gauteng.

The Denel Overberg Test Range uses the Overberg Air Force Base.

References

External links
af.mil.za
saairforce.co.za

Overberg
Overberg
Transport in the Western Cape
Cape Agulhas Local Municipality